Las Margaritas may refer to:

Las Margaritas, Chiapas, Mexico
Las Margaritas (Madrid), Spain
Las Margaritas, Panama